Sahibzada Farooq Ali (5 September 1931 – 29 November 2020) was a Pakistani politician, the ninth Speaker of National Assembly of Pakistan. He was elected from the city of Multan.

Early life 
Sahibzada Farooq Ali was born on 5 September 1931. He belonged to the Toor tribe and was native of Wayanwali village near Ghakhar Mandi in Pakistan's Wazirabad.

Career
Ali was the head of the Information and Public Relations department and the Arts and Culture department for Multan and Bahawalpur before going to the parliament. He was the chairman of the Special Committee of the whole House of the National Assembly of Pakistan, proceedings of which were held in camera to consider the Ahmadiyya issue. The Special Committee unanimously adopted a resolution on September 7, 1974, to declare the Ahmadiyya Movement and its offshoot, the Lahore Ahmadiyya Movement for the Propagation of Islam to be non-Muslims.

Death 
Sahibzada Farooq Ali died on 29 November 2020 in Multan. His funeral prayers were held at Shahi Eidgah and was attended by large number of people.

References

Speakers of the National Assembly of Pakistan
Politicians from Multan
Punjabi people
Pakistani MNAs 1972–1977
1931 births
2020 deaths